John Woolfolk (1797  – January 22, 1859) was a nineteenth-century American politician from Virginia.

Early life
Woolfolk was born on "Pear Grove" plantation in Orange County, Virginia in 1797. He graduated from the College of William and Mary in 1819, and later from the B. L. Laughton Law School.

Career

As an adult, Woolfolk made his home in Orange County practicing law.

Woolfolk served in the Virginia House of Delegates for several years, then the state Senate for two terms.

In 1850, Woolfolk was elected to the Virginia Constitutional Convention of 1850. He was one of three delegates elected from the central Piedmont delegate district made up of his home district of Orange County, as well as Culpeper, Greene and Madison Counties.

Death
John Woolfolk died in Orange County, Virginia on January 22, 1859.

References

Bibliography

Members of the Virginia House of Delegates
1797 births
1859 deaths
People from Orange County, Virginia
College of William & Mary alumni